Donato Seppi (born in Bolzano in 1953) is an Italian politician, who has founded the local party Unitalia.

Life
Donato Seppi was the owner of a small company engaged in the construction industry, and a former Alpini officer. He was elected in 1995 for the National Alliance in the Bolzano city council.In 1996, Seppi founded with several like-minded persons the party Unitalia, whose current chairman he is. In 1998 he got elected into the Landtag of South Tyrol and became thereby also a member of the regional council of Trentino-Alto Adige/Südtirol.Since January 2008 the party was the provincial section of The Right in South Tyrol, but left that party as soon as in November, when Seppi decided to join the Movement for Italy (Movimento per l'Italia/MpI), a split from "The Right" led by Daniela Santanché and since then Unitalia became the provincial section of the MpI.In the 2008 provincial election the party won 1.9% of the votes and Seppi was re-elected to the Landtag. However, in the 2013 provincial election Seppi and his party failed to gain a seat with only 1.7% of the votes.

Notes

External links
Seppi on the website of the Provincial Council of South Tyrol

Politicians from Bolzano
Italian city councillors
Alpini
National Alliance (Italy) politicians
1953 births
Living people
Members of the Landtag of South Tyrol